Traditional to botanical taxonomy, subdivisions of taxonomic ranks further divide subgenera, sections, and subsections into species and subspecies/varieties. Genus Rhododendron consists of eight subgenera based on morphology; this page refers to only those lower divisions in subgenus Rhododendron, commonly known as the scaly or lepidote rhododendrons. Molecular evidence suggests that the subgenus Rhododendron is monophyletic, and the section Vireya is monophyletic as well with section Pogonanthum being nested within section Rhododendron. As evidenced by the following list, many subsections contain only one species, and many contain only one species that is followed by subspecies or varieties. Criteria for division into subsections may be subjective based on morphology. Recent studies have suggested a revision to the name of section Vireya; the section Vireya is referred to as Schistanthe, but contains all the subsections associated with the previous name. In this article, the two can be used interchangeably.

This list does not include known hybrids; because rhododendrons are known to hybridize readily, hybrid species are numerous and are not referenced in this list.

subgenus Rhododendron
section Pogonanthum
Rhododendron anthopogon
Rhododendron anthopogon ssp. anthopogon
Rhododendron anthopogon ssp. hypenanthum
Rhododendron anthopogonoides
Rhododendron cephalanthum
Rhododendron cephalanthum ssp. cephalanthum
Rhododendron cephalanthum ssp. platyphllum
Rhododendron collettianum
Rhododendron fragrans
Rhododendron kongboense
Rhododendron laudandum
Rhododendron laudandum var. laudandum
Rhododendron laudandum var. temoense
Rhododendron primuliflorum
Rhododendron sargentianum
Rhododendron trichostomum
Rhododendron rufescens
Rhododendron pogonophyllum
Rhododendron radendum
section Rhododendron
subsection Afghanica
Rhododendron afghanicum
subsection Baileya
Rhododendron baileyi
subsection Boothia
Rhododendron boothii
Rhododendron chrysodoron
Rhododendron dekatanum
Rhododendron leptocarpum
Rhododendron leucaspis
Rhododendron megeratum
Rhododendron sulfureum
subsection Camelliiflora
Rhododendron camelliiflorum
subsection Campylogynum
Rhododendron campylogynum
Rhododendron campylogynum var. leucanthum
Rhododendron campylogynum var. eupodum
subsection Caroliniana
Rhododendron minus
Rhododendron minus var. minus
Rhododendron minus var. champmanii
subsection Cinnabarinum
Rhododendron cinnabarinum
Rhododendron cinnabarinum ssp. cinnabarinum
Rhododendron cinnabarinum ssp. tamaense
Rhododendron cinnabarinum ssp. xanthocodon
Rhododendron keysii
subsection Edgeworthia
Rhododendron edgeworthii
Rhododendron pendulum
Rhododendron seinghkuense
subsection Fragariflora
Rhododendron fragariiflorum
subsection Genestieriana
Rhododendron genestierianum
subsection Glauca
Rhododendron brachyanthum
Rhododendron brachyanthum ssp. brachyanthum
Rhododendron brachyanthum ssp. hypolepidotum
Rhododendron charitopes
Rhododendron charitopes ssp. charitopes
Rhododendron charitopes ssp. tsangpoense
Rhododendron glaucophyllum
Rhododendron glaucophyllum var. glaucophyllum
Rhododendron glaucophyllum var. album
Rhododendron glaucophyllum var. tubiforme
Rhododendron luteiflorum
Rhododendron pruniflorum
Rhododendron shweliense
subsection Heliolepida
Rhododendron bracteatum
Rhododendron heliolepis
Rhododendron heliolepis var. heliolepis
Rhododendron heliolepis var. brevistylum
Rhododendron heliolepis var. fumidum
Rhododendron rubiginosum
subsection Lapponica
Rhododendron bulu
Rhododendron capitatum
Rhododendron complexum
Rhododendron cuneatum
Rhododendron dasypetalum
Rhododendron fastigiatum
Rhododendron flavidum
Rhododendron hippophaeoides
Rhododendron hippophaeoides var. hippophaeoides
Rhododendron hippophaeoides var. occidentale
Rhododendron impeditum
Rhododendron intricatum
Rhododendron lapponicum
Rhododendron nitidulum
Rhododendron nitidulum var. nitidulum
Rhododendron nitidulum var. omeiense
Rhododendron nivale
Rhododendron nivale ssp. nivale
Rhododendron nivale ssp. boreale
Rhododendron nivale ssp. australe
Rhododendron orthocladum
Rhododendron orthocladum var. orthocladum
Rhododendron orthocladum var. microleucum
Rhododendron polycladum
Rhododendron rupicola
Rhododendron rupicola var. chryseum
Rhododendron rupicola var. muliense
Rhododendron rupicola var. rupicola
Rhododendron russatum
Rhododendron setosum
Rhododendron tapetiforme
Rhododendron telmateium
Rhododendron thymiflolium
Rhododendron tsaii
Rhododendron websterianum
Rhododendron yungningense
subsection Ledum
Rhododendron columbianum
Rhododendron diversipilosum
Rhododendron groenlandicum
Rhododendron hypoleucum
Rhododendron neoglandulosum
Rhododendron subarticum
Rhododendron subulatum
Rhododendron tolmachevii
Rhododendron tomentosum
Rhododendron tomentosum var. tomentostrum
Rhododendron tomentosum var. palustre
subsection Lepidota
Rhododendron cowanianum
Rhododendron lepidotum
Rhododendron lowndesii
subsection Maddenia
Rhododendron burmanicum
Rhododendron carneum
Rhododendron ciliatum
Rhododendron coxianum
Rhododendron dalhousiae
Rhododendron dalhousiae var. dalhousiae
Rhododendron dalhousiae var. rhabdotum
Rhododendron dendricola
Rhododendron excellens
Rhododendron fletcherianum
Rhododendron formosum
Rhododendron formosum var. formosum
Rhododendron formosum var. inaequale
Rhododendron horlickianum
Rhododendron johnstoneanum
Rhododendron leptocladon
Rhododendron levinei
Rhododendron liliiflorum
Rhododendron lindleyi
Rhododendron ludwigianum
Rhododendron lyi
Rhododendron maddenii
Rhododendron maddenii ssp. maddenii
Rhododendron maddenii ssp. crassum
Rhododendron megacalyx
Rhododendron nuttallii
Rhododendron pachypodum
Rhododendron pseudociliipes
Rhododendron roseatum
Rhododendron scopulorum
Rhododendron taggianum
Rhododendron valentinianum
Rhododendron veitchianum
Rhododendron walongense
subsection Micrantha
Rhododendron micranthum
subsection Monantha
Rhododendron monanthum
subsection Moupinensia
Rhododendron dendrocharis
Rhododendron moupinense
Rhododendron petrocharis
subsection Rhododendron
Rhododendron ferrugineum
Rhododendron hirsutum
Rhododendron myrtifolium
subsection Rhodorastra
Rhododendron dauricum
Rhododendron mucronulatum
Rhododendron mucronulatum var. mucronulatum
Rhododendron mucronulatum var. taquetii
Rhododendron sichotense
subsection Saluenensia
Rhododendron calostrotum
Rhododendron calostrotum ssp. calostrotum
Rhododendron calostrotum ssp. riparium
Rhododendron calostrotum ssp. riparioides
Rhododendron calostrotum ssp. keleticum
Rhododendron saluenense
Rhododendron saluenense ssp. saluenense
Rhododendron saluenense ssp. chameunum
subsection Scabrifolia
Rhododendron hemitrichotum
Rhododendron mollicomum
Rhododendron pubescens
Rhododendron racemosum
Rhododendron scabrifolium
Rhododendron scabrifolium var. scabrifolium
Rhododendron scabrifolium var. spiciferum
Rhododendron spinuliferum
subsection Tephropepia
Rhododendron auritum
Rhododendron hanceanum
Rhododendron longistylum
Rhododendron tephropeplum
Rhododendron xanthostephanum
subsection Trichoclada
Rhododendron caesium
Rhododendron lepidostylum
Rhododendron mekongense
Rhododendron mekongense var. mekongense
Rhododendron mekongense var. rubrolineatum
Rhododendron trichocladum
Rhododendron viridescens
subsection Triflora
Rhododendron ambiguum
Rhododendron augustinii
Rhododendron augustinii ssp. augustinii
Rhododendron augustinii ssp. chasmanthum
Rhododendron augustinii ssp. hardyi
Rhododendron augustinii ssp. rubrum
Rhododendron bivelatum
Rhododendron concinnum
Rhododendron keiskei
Rhododendron keiskei var. keiski
Rhododendron keiskei var. ozawae
Rhododendron lutescens
Rhododendron polylepis
Rhododendron seariane
Rhododendron trichanthum
Rhododendron triflorum
Rhododendron zaleucum
Rhododendron zaleucum var. zaleucum
Rhododendron zaleucum var. flaviflorum
Rhododendron davidsonianum
Rhododendron rigidum
Rhododendron siderophyllum
Rhododendron tatsienense
Rhododendron yunnanense
Rhododendron oreotrephes
subsection Uniflora
Rhododendron imperator
Rhododendron ludlowii
Rhododendron pemakoense
Rhododendron pumilum
Rhododendron uniflorum
subsection Virgata
Rhododendron virgatum
Rhododendron virgatum ssp. virgatum
Rhododendron virgatum ssp. oleifolium
section Vireya/Schistanthe
subsection Euvireya
Malesia group
Rhododendron abietifolium
Rhododendron acrophilum
Rhododendron bagobonum
Rhododendron brassii
Rhododendron burttii
Rhododendron buxifolium
Rhododendron citrinum
Rhododendron commonae
Rhododendron cornu-bovis
Rhododendron flavoviride
Rhododendron helodes
Rhododendron inconspicuum
Rhododendron meijeri
Rhododendron multicolor
Rhododendron nieuwenhuisii
Rhododendron pauciflorum
Rhododendron pseudobuxifolium
Rhododendron pubigermen
Rhododendron rhodostomum
Rhododendron rousei
Rhododendron stevensianum
Rhododendron subcrenulatum
Rhododendron subuliferum
Rhododendron taxifolium
Rhododendron tuhanensis
Rhododendron vidalii
Rhododendron vitis-idaea
Rhododendron wrightianum
Solenovireya group
Rhododendron alborugosum
Rhododendron archboldianum
Rhododendron armitii
Rhododendron carrii
Rhododendron carringtoniae
Rhododendron cruttwellii
Rhododendron edanoi
Rhododendron goodenoughii
Rhododendron jasminiflorum
Rhododendron lambianum
Rhododendron loranthiflorum
Rhododendron majus
Rhododendron multinervium
Rhododendron niveoflorum
Rhododendron pleianthum
Rhododendron radians
Rhododendron rhodoleucum
Rhododendron roseiflorum
Rhododendron ruttenii
Rhododendron stapfianum
Rhododendron suaveolens
Rhododendron tuba
Euvireya group
Rhododendron alticola
Rhododendron arfakianum
Rhododendron aurigeranum
Rhododendron baconii
Rhododendron baenitzianum
Rhododendron blackii
Rhododendron bloembergenii
Rhododendron celebicum
Rhododendron christianae
Rhododendron crassifolium
Rhododendron culminicola
Rhododendron curviflorum
Rhododendron exuberans
Rhododendron glabriflorum
Rhododendron impositum
Rhododendron intranervatum
Rhododendron javanicum
Rhododendron kochii
Rhododendron laetum
Rhododendron lanceolatum
Rhododendron leptobrachion
Rhododendron leucogigas
Rhododendron lochiae
Rhododendron longiflorum
Rhododendron lowii
Rhododendron luraluense
Rhododendron macgregoriae
Rhododendron madulidii
Rhododendron maxwellii
Rhododendron mendumiae
Rhododendron nervulosum
Rhododendron orbiculatum
Rhododendron pachystima
Rhododendron polyanthemum
Rhododendron praetervisum
Rhododendron rarilepidotum
Rhododendron renschianum
Rhododendron retivenium
Rhododendron rhodopus
Rhododendron robinsonii
Rhododendron rugosum
Rhododendron salicifolium
Rhododendron scabridibracteum
Rhododendron seranicum
Rhododendron sessilifolium
Rhododendron stenophylum
Rhododendron sumatranum
Rhododendron vanvuurenii
Rhododendron verticilliatum
Rhododendron viriosum
Rhododendron williamsii
Rhododendron yongii
Rhododendron zoelleri
Linnaeopsis group
Rhododendron anagalliflorum
Rhododendron caespitosum
Rhododendron gracilentum
Rhododendron microphyllum
Rhododendron pusillum
Rhododendron rubineiflorum
Rhododendron schizostigma
Rhododendron womersleyi
Saxifragoidea group
Rhododendron saxafragoides
subsection Malyovireya
Rhododendron acuminatum
Rhododendron apoanum
Rhododendron durionifolium
Rhododendron fallanicum
Rhododendron himantodes
Rhododendron lamrialianum
Rhododendron lineare
Rhododendron malayanum
Rhododendron micromalayanum
Rhododendron vinicolor
subsection Discovireya
Rhododendron adinophyllum
Rhododendron borneense
Rhododendron cunefolium
Rhododendron ericoides
Rhododendron erosipetalum
Rhododendron gaultheriifolium
Rhododendron lindaueanum
Rhododendron meliphagidum
Rhododendron monodii
Rhododendron nanophyton
Rhododendron nummatum
Rhododendron perakense
Rhododendron pulleanum
Rhododendron quadrasianum
Rhododendron retusum
Rhododendron scortechinii
subsection Pseudovireya
Rhododendron densifolium
Rhododendron emarginatum
Rhododendron kawakamii
Rhododendron rushforthii
Rhododendron santapauii
Rhododendron vaccinoides
subsection Siphonovireya
Rhododendron agathodaemonis
Rhododendron dutartrei
Rhododendron habbemae
Rhododendron herzogii
Rhododendron inundatum
Rhododendron searleanum
subsection Albovireya
Rhododendron aequabile
Rhododendron album
Rhododendron arenicola
Rhododendron correoides
Rhododendron lagunculicarpum
Rhododendron pudorinum
Rhododendron versteegii
Rhododendron yelliotii
subsection Phaeovireya
Rhododendron beyerinckianum
Rhododendron bryophilum
Rhododendron caliginis
Rhododendron dianthosmum
Rhododendron dielsianum
Rhododendron evelyneae
Rhododendron eymae
Rhododendron gardenia
Rhododendron haematophthalmum
Rhododendron hellwigi
Rhododendron hyacinthosmum
Rhododendron kawir
Rhododendron konori
Rhododendron leptanthum
Rhododendron phaeochitum
Rhododendron phaeops
Rhododendron rarum
Rhododendron rhodochroum
Rhododendron rubellum
Rhododendron solitarium
Rhododendron superbum
Rhododendron tintinnabellum
Rhododendron truncicola
Rhododendron tuberculiferum

See also
List of Rhododendron species

References

Bibliography
 “Vireya Species Gallery.” Edited by Chris Callard, Vireya.net, last updated 28 Jan. 2015, vireya.net/gallery-sp.htm.
 Cox, Peter A. & Cox, Kenneth N. E. (1997). The Encyclopedia of Rhododendron Species. Glendoick Publishing. .
 Craven, L.A.; Goetsch, L.A.; Hall, B.D.; Brown, G.K. (2008). "Classification of the Vireya group of Rhododendron (Ericaceae)". Blumea - Biodiversity, Evolution and Biogeography of Plants. 53 (2): 435–442. doi:10.3767/000651908X608070.
 Cullen, J. (1980). "A revision of Rhododendron I. Subgenus Rhododendron sections Rhododendron and Pogonanthum". Notes from the Royal Botanic Garden Edinburgh. 39 (1). ISSN 0080-4274.
 Goetsch, L.A.; Craven, L.A.; Hall, B.D. (2011). "Major speciation accompanied the dispersal of Vireya Rhododendrons (Ericaceae, Rhododendron sect. Schistanthe) through the     Malayan archipelago: Evidence from nuclear gene sequences". Taxon. 60 (4): 1015–1028.
 Goetsch, Loretta; Eckert, Andrew J.; Hall, Benjamin D. (July–September 2005). "The molecular systematics of Rhododendron (Ericaceae): a phylogeny based upon RPB2 gene sequences". Systematic Botany. 30 (3): 616–626. doi:10.1600/0363644054782170

Sections
Plant taxonomies
Lists of plants
Plant sections